KID (590 kHz) was a commercial AM radio station located in Idaho Falls, Idaho, broadcasting on 590 AM. KID aired news/talk programming, which included syndicated programs like Sean Hannity, Glenn Beck, and Ben Shapiro.

History
The station was first licensed under the call sign KGIO, and began broadcasting on December 3, 1928, on a frequency of 1320 kHz. On February 16, 1929, the call sign was changed to KID, and the station began broadcasting under this call sign. The station had moved to 1350 kHz by 1942 (likely in the March 29, 1941, changes, pursuant to the North American Regional Broadcasting Agreement, which saw many stations change frequency) where it stayed for several years. In 1950, the station changed from 1350 to its final frequency 590 kHz.

In October 2007, a deal was reached for KID to be acquired by GAP Broadcasting II LLC (Samuel Weller, president) from Clear Channel Communications as part of a 57-station deal with a total reported sale price of $74.78 million. What eventually became GapWest Broadcasting was folded into Townsquare Media on August 13, 2010; Townsquare, in turn, sold its Idaho Falls–Pocatello stations to Rich Broadcasting in 2011.

The station initially went off the air in November 2021, when a farmer accidentally knocked down one of the station's transmission towers in Iona, Idaho. Rich Broadcasting applied for an insurance settlement, only to find out that the farmer, who claimed ownership of the property that KID was leasing for the transmitter, had collected the insurance payment. Rich Broadcasting hired an attorney to dispute the farmer's claims but, in the meantime, the property owner demolished two remaining towers on the site and removed all broadcasting equipment. After Rich Broadcasting determined that determined the cost of keeping the FCC license and replacing the destroyed equipment would have cost between $1.5 and $2 million, in addition to the cost of leasing a new property, the company decided to not return to AM broadcasting. Rich Broadcasting surrendered the KID license on February 23, 2023; the Federal Communications Commission cancelled it on March 3. The station's former schedule continues to be broadcast on FM on 92.1 KIDG and 106.3 KIDJ.

References

External links
FCC Station Search Details: DKID (Facility ID: 22194)
FCC History Cards for KID  (covering 1928-1980 as KGIO / KID)

ID
Defunct radio stations in the United States
ID
Radio stations established in 1928
1928 establishments in Idaho
Radio stations disestablished in 2023
2023 disestablishments in Idaho